CFR Stadium is a multi-use stadium in Craiova. It was the home ground of Gaz Metan CFR Craiova and has 3,000 seats.

Football venues in Romania
Buildings and structures in Craiova